The 2015 Formula Renault 2.0 Alps Series was the fifth year of the Formula Renault 2.0 Alps series, and the fourteenth season of the former Swiss Formula Renault Championship. The championship began on 12 April at Imola and finished on 11 October at Jerez after sixteen races held at seven meetings. The 2015 season featured a new three-race weekend format for rounds at the Red Bull Ring and Monza.

In a final-race decider, British driver Jack Aitken secured the drivers' championship title by five points ahead of his Koiranen GP team-mate Jake Hughes. Aitken trailed Hughes by five points going into the race at Jerez, but Aitken's third-place finish – behind Ben Barnicoat and Anthoine Hubert, who were both ineligible to score championship points – to Hughes' ninth-place finish (third amongst Alps runners) gave him the honours. Aitken took four overall wins during the season, as well as taking three further class wins as the best Alps runner behind drivers ineligible for the drivers' championship. Hughes took three overall wins, adding a fourth class win at Pau. Third place in the championship was also settled in the final race, in favour of Thiago Vivacqua ahead of JD Motorsport team-mate Matevos Isaakyan. Vivacqua, a race-winner at Monza, prevailed by four points over Isaakyan, who took two overall wins and a further class win.

The only other championship-eligible driver to take a race victory was Vasily Romanov, who took a race victory at Monza for Cram Motorsport; he ultimately finished the season in sixth place in the championship. Two guest drivers took race victories during the season; Hubert won four races from six starts for Tech 1 Racing, while Barnicoat won the final race at Jerez for Fortec Motorsports. In the teams' championship, the performances of Aitken and Hughes saw Koiranen GP comfortably win the title, by almost 200 points ahead of JD Motorsport. In the junior championship for drivers under the age of 18, Isaakyan took eleven victories and finished 83 points clear of his nearest challenger, Philip Hamprecht.

Drivers and teams

Race calendar and results
The seven-event calendar for the 2015 season was announced on 5 October 2014. As in 2014, only three rounds were held in Italy – at Monza, Imola and Misano. The Pau Grand Prix, Red Bull Ring, Spa-Francorchamps and Jerez were the remaining four rounds.

Championship standings
Points system
Points were awarded to the top 10 classified finishers.

Drivers' championship

Juniors' championship

Teams' championship
Prior to each round of the championship, two drivers from each team – if applicable – were nominated to score teams' championship points.

References

External links
 Official website of the Formula Renault 2.0 Alps championship

Alps
Formula Renault 2.0 Alps
Formula Renault 2.0 Alps
Renault Alps